Marilyn Travinsky is an American Democratic politician from Southbridge, Massachusetts. She represented the 6th Worcester district in the Massachusetts House of Representatives from 1983 to 1991, where she served as the first female chair of its Commerce and Labor Committee.

Travinsky received her bachelor's degree at Albertus Magnus College and her master's at Wesleyan University. After politics, she led Tri-Valley Inc. for 25 years as its CEO.

See also
 1983-1984 Massachusetts legislature
 1985-1986 Massachusetts legislature
 1987-1988 Massachusetts legislature
 1989-1990 Massachusetts legislature

References

Year of birth missing
Year of death missing
Democratic Party members of the Massachusetts House of Representatives
Women state legislators in Massachusetts
Albertus Magnus College alumni
Wesleyan University alumni
People from Southbridge, Massachusetts